The Colwich rail crash occurred on the evening of Friday 19 September 1986 at Colwich Junction, Staffordshire, England.  It was significant in that it was a high speed collision between two packed express trains. One driver was killed, but no passengers died because of the great strength of the rolling stock involved, which included examples of Mk1, Mk2 and Mk3 coaches.

Background 

Colwich Junction lies between Rugeley and Stafford and is where the four-track West Coast Main Line from London splits into two routes. Approaching from the south, two tracks go to Manchester via Stoke-on-Trent and two tracks go to Stafford and Crewe. In the middle of the layout, two of the lines cross each other at a diamond crossing.

In August 1986, the signalling was altered so that drivers of northbound trains taking the Stoke line would see flashing yellow signals on approach. The rulebook meaning of this was:

"A flashing yellow aspect means facing points at a junction ahead are set for a diverging route and the speed of the train must be reduced".

This sequence of signalling was designed for use at higher-speed turnouts as a replacement for approach release, where the junction signal is held at red until the train is near to it.

Over the next few years, flashing yellows were also installed at locations where trains cross over between different tracks travelling in the same direction, e.g. from a "fast" line to a "slow" line. While not "junctions" in the traditional sense, the signalling sequence was identical to that given at a "diverging" route.

The accident 

On 19 September 1986, the signalman at Colwich saw that the 17:00 express train from London Euston to Manchester Piccadilly was approaching the junction at roughly the same time as the 17:20 express from Liverpool to Euston. He decided to give precedence to the latter and so the Manchester train might need to wait its turn over the junction.

The Manchester train needed to cross from the Down Fast to the Down Slow line before turning off towards Stoke. The signals presented to its driver were as follows:

After passing over the crossover he saw that CH23 was still red. Having interpreted the flashing yellows to mean that the route was set all the way over the junction to Stoke, he was expecting this signal to clear as he approached it (as under the approach release system). But as he got nearer he realised it had not.

The driver made an emergency brake application but the train did not stop before reaching the diamond crossing. At that moment he saw the Liverpool train approaching at high speed and shouted a warning to a trainee driver who was also in the cab. They both jumped from the locomotive almost immediately before the Liverpool train collided with it.

The locomotive of the Liverpool train was 86211 City of Milton Keynes. It hit the other locomotive 86429 The Times side-on, which finished up in the wreckage with its body twisted and split open. The passenger coaches were scattered in all directions and some had their ends badly damaged. Eric Goode, the driver of no. 86211, was killed.  It was also reported that Nicaragua's ambassador to Britain, Francisco d'Escoto, was one of the injured passengers.

Investigation 

After the accident, the driver went to the signal box and told the signalman "You had double flashing yellows and the route was set for Stoke".  With "traditional" junction layouts in mind, flashing yellows would have meant that the route was set for him right through the junction, with at worst, the red signal on the far side. It was not; at Colwich the signalling system was designed for the 'diverging route' to be only the crossover from the Down Fast to the Down Slow, and the driver was not expecting to see a red signal before taking the Stoke line. In this respect railway nomenclature had unwittingly set a trap; he had after all seen a 'Junction Indicator' illuminated and thus assumed that his train had been routed across the junction.

The public inquiry centred on whether the driver had had adequate training on the recently introduced flashing yellow signals and the implications at multiple junctions (Hall 1987). The driver admitting to signing for, but not actually reading, the Notice that referred to the installation of flashing yellows at Colwich the previous month.

A contributory factor was the lack of flank protection given the layout at Colwich Junction. The accident would not have happened if the points had been set to route the train away from the diamond crossing, rather than head-on into the Liverpool train's path, as would have been normal practice in an older manual installation. This feature was not included in the junction design because it would have prevented a parallel movement from being signalled on the down fast line, even though in this particular case the train had approached on the down fast line anyway.

This lesson was not learnt; lack of flank protection would again prove a significant factor in a head-on collision, at the Ladbroke Grove rail crash in 1999 (Hall 2003).

Recommendations 

The Inspector's report recommended changing the signalling system so that a flashing yellow sequence could only occur when the route was set across the whole junction, as the driver was expecting. A second recommendation was to inhibit wheel slide protection (WSP) during an emergency brake application – practical tests suggested the train could then have stopped before fouling the junction. The latter recommendation was not implemented.

Memorial 

Local resident Alf Taylor created a memorial to Eric Goode at the site of the accident, which he looked after until his death in 1997. On 17 September 2006, the Sunday before the 20th anniversary of the accident, the garden was re-dedicated.

See also 
 List of rail accidents in the United Kingdom
 Lists of rail accidents

Notes

References

External links 
BBC News: On this day: 19 September
BBC news: BBC News article relating 20th anniversary of crash

Railway accidents and incidents in Staffordshire
Railway accidents in 1986
1986 disasters in the United Kingdom
1986 in England
20th century in Staffordshire
Railway accidents involving a signal passed at danger
Accidents and incidents involving British Rail
September 1986 events in the United Kingdom
Train collisions in England
Rail accidents caused by a driver's error